Anny Duperey (born Annie Legras; 28 June 1947) is a French actress, published photographer and best-selling author with a career spanning almost six decades as of 2021 and more than eighty cinema or television credits, around thirty theatre productions and 15 books. She is a five-time Molière Award for Best Actress nominee (known as the French Tony Awards), was awarded two 7 d'Or (equivalent to the Emmy Awards) and was nominated for the César Award for Best Supporting Actress (known as the French Oscars) for Yves Robert's Pardon Mon Affaire (1976). In 1977, she received the  awarded by the Académie Française. She is more commercially known for her leading role as Catherine Beaumont in the TF1 hit series Une famille formidable which ran for 15 seasons (1992-2018) regularly topping national primetime viewership numbers and also broadcast throughout french-speaking europe peaking at 11 millions viewers in France alone. Some of her most notable feature films include Jean-Luc Godard's Two or Three Things I Know About Her (1967); Roger Vadim's Spirits of the Dead (1968); André Hunebelle's The Return of Monte Cristo (1968); Alain Resnais' Stavisky (1974); Umberto Lenzi's From Hell to Victory (1979); Henri Verneuil's A Thousand Billion Dollars (1982), Claude Berri's Germinal (1993) or Alain Resnais' You Ain't Seen Nothin' Yet (2012). She was made a Chevalier (French: Knight) of the Légion d'honneur as part of the French Republic's 2012 New Year decoration class also honouring Hélène Carrère d'Encausse, Maurice Herzog and Salma Hayek. She has been a supporter of the charity SOS Children's Villages since 1993.

Early life
Duperey's family is from La Neuville-Chant-d'Oisel in Normandy. She lost her parents, Lucien and Ginette Legras who were both photographers, at the age of 8 as they accidentally died on November 6, 1955 in Sotteville-lès-Rouen poisoned by carbon monoxide in their bathroom due to a faulty gas water heater and insufficient ventilation. Following this incident, she was raised by her paternal grandmother. After attending her local theatre conservatory courses, she moved to Paris to attend those of René Simon. She started out as a model and took her first steps on stage in 1965, playing in La Mamma by André Roussin and made her screen debut in Jean-Luc Godard's Two or Three Things I Know About Her (1967).

Career

She co-starred in two French horror films, Spirits of the Dead (1968) and The Blood Rose (1970).In the 1974 Alain Resnais film Stavisky, she portrayed Arlette, the beautiful real-life wife of flamboyant swindler Alexandre Stavisky played by Jean-Paul Belmondo. Anny Duperey was nominated for the 1977 César Award for Best Actress in a Supporting Role for her performance in "Un éléphant ça trompe énormément" (An Elephant Can Be Extremely Deceptive). For her work in television, she has won two 7 d'Or Best Actress awards. In English-language film, Anny Duperey appeared with Al Pacino in the 1977 Sydney Pollack film Bobby Deerfield. Other notable appearances include Les Compères and TV series since 1992 Une famille formidable.

In fall of 2006, she led in an adaption of Oscar and the Lady in Pink (2002, French: Oscar et la dame rose), a novel written by Éric-Emmanuel Schmitt; she performed at the L'Avant-Seine Theater in Colombes.

Personal life
Her younger sister Patricia died in 2009 of a heart problem. She lived with actor Bernard Giraudeau for eighteen years, they had two children, Gael in 1982 and Sara in 1985. They separated in 1991, and Duperay married Cris Campion in 1993, but they also separated after some ten years. She has called Giraudeau “the man of my life” and Campion “the love of my life”. She is the grandmother of four: Mona (2011) and Bonnie (2016), daughters of Sara, and Romy (2015) and Susanne (2018), daughters of Gael.

Charity Work

A social activist, Anny Duperey has volunteered for causes such as the international child welfare organisation SOS Children's Villages and SOS-PAPA an international organization to help ensure children of divorce have full participation by both parents.

Filmography

Feature films

Television

Theater

Author
In addition to her talents as an actress, Duperey is a successful author of a number of bestselling books including  L'admiroir (1976),  Le Nez de Mazarin (Mazarin's Nose) (1986), Le voile noir (The Black Veil) (1992), Je vous écris (I'm Writing To You) (1993), Les chats de hasard (The fortune cats) (1999), Allons plus loin, veux-tu? (Let's go further, will you?) (2002) Les chats mots (The cats words) (2003) and Une soirée (An evening) (2005).

Awards and nominations

Molière Award

César Awards

References

External links

 
 
 Mini biographie de Anny Duperey

1947 births
Living people
Writers from Rouen
French stage actresses
French film actresses
French television actresses
20th-century French novelists
21st-century French novelists
French activists
French women activists
Chevaliers of the Légion d'honneur
French National Academy of Dramatic Arts alumni
20th-century French women writers
21st-century French women writers
Actors from Rouen